Givhan is a surname. Notable people with the surname include: 

 Robin Givhan (born 1964), American fashion editor
 Sam Givhan, American politician
 Walter C. Givhan (1902–1976), American politician